Acacia orites, also commonly known as mountain wattle, is a shrub belonging to the genus Acacia and the subgenus Juliflorae that is native to north eastern Australia.

Description
The tree can grow to a maximum height of  that has obscure stipules on the branchlets. Like most species of Acacia it has phyllodes rather than true leaves. The dark green coloured phylloeds are thin and pliable and have an apex that is occasionally uncinate and have six to nine anastomosing veins of which one to three are much more clearly defined than the others. It blooms between August and September producing golden flowers.

Distribution
It is endemic to south eastern parts of Queensland and north eastern parts of New South Wales where it is often found along the margins of rainforest communities.

See also
List of Acacia species

References

orites
Flora of Queensland
Taxa named by Leslie Pedley
Plants described in 1964